The 1937 Green Bay Packers season was their 19th season overall and their 17th season in the National Football League. The team finished with a 7–4 record under coach Curly Lambeau, earning them a second-place finish in the Western Conference.

Schedule

Note: Intra-division opponents are in bold text.

Standings

References
 Sportsencyclopedia.com

Green Bay Packers
Green Bay Packers seasons
Green Bay Packers